The 2015 Cholet Pays de Loire Dames was the 12th edition of the Cholet Pays de Loire Dames, a one-day women's cycle race held in Cholet, France. It was held on 22 March 2015, as a UCI-rated 1.2 race.

Results

See also
 2015 in women's road cycling

References

Cholet Pays de Loire Dames
Cholet Pays de Loire Dames
Cholet Pays de Loire Dames